Gabela may refer to:

 Gabela, Bosnia and Herzegovina, a village near Čapljina
 Gabela, Angola, a city in Amboim, Cuanza Sul